WEVO (89.1 FM) is a radio station licensed to serve Concord, New Hampshire and serving the Manchester-Nashua-Concord area. The station is owned by New Hampshire Public Radio, and is the flagship affiliate of their public radio network. The station is one of the most powerful in the state, reaching from the White Mountains to Massachusetts Route 128 to southern Vermont.

Translators

External links
 nhpr.org

EVO
Concord, New Hampshire
Radio stations established in 1981
NPR member stations